Aghcheh Qeshlaq-e Olya (also Romanized as Āghcheh Qeshlāq-e ‘Olyā; also known as Āghcheh Qeshlāq-e Bālā, Āqcheh Qeshlāq-e ‘Olyā, and Aşlānlū) is a village in Sanjabad-e Shomali Rural District, in the Central District of Kowsar County, Ardabil Province, Iran. At the 2006 census, its population was 33, in 10 families.

References 

Towns and villages in Kowsar County